Skeletocutis odora is a species of fungus belonging to the family Incrustoporiaceae.

Synonyms:
 Polyporus odorus Peck, 1885

References

Polyporales